Kim Hyuk (born 1972) is a South Korean judoka. He won a gold medal in the lightweight (65 kg) division at the 1997 World Judo Championships in Paris. In 1994, Kim won five international competitions including Paris Open (Tournoi de Paris), the Asian Games in Hiroshima, Japan and the Goodwill Games in St. Petersburg, Russia.

Kim Hyuk is currently the assistant coach of the South Korean women's judo team for the 2008 Summer Olympics.

Personal life
In 1999, Kim married a Japanese female judoka Yuko Emoto, the gold medalist at the 1996 Summer Olympics.

References

Living people
Asian Games medalists in judo
1972 births
Judoka at the 1994 Asian Games
Yong In University alumni
South Korean male judoka
Asian Games gold medalists for South Korea
Medalists at the 1994 Asian Games
Universiade medalists in judo
Goodwill Games medalists in judo
Universiade gold medalists for South Korea
Competitors at the 1994 Goodwill Games
20th-century South Korean people